Juxtapose is the fourth official studio album by English musician Tricky. It was released on 16 August 1999 via Island Records in collaboration with American record producers DJ Muggs and Dame Grease. It features guest appearances from British rapper Mad Dog, Kioka Williams, who provides the majority of the female vocals on the album and the following tours, and D'NA. The album's lead single, "For Real", was released on 3 August 1999. The song "Contradictive" later appeared in Brokedown Palace and the song "Scrappy Love" appeared in Without a Trace. The album peaked at number 22 in the UK, number 182 in the US, and also reached number 8 in Norway.

Track listing

Charts

References

External links

1999 albums
Collaborative albums
Island Records albums
Tricky (musician) albums
Albums produced by DJ Muggs
Albums produced by Dame Grease